Manéglise is a commune in the Seine-Maritime department in the Normandy region in northern France.

Geography

Heraldry

Population

Places of interest
 The church of St. Germain, dating from the eleventh century.
 A sixteenth-century chapel.
 The château des Hellandes, built in 1904 by Monsieur Levesque on the site of a 17th-century manorhouse. It was used as a hospital during World War I.

Twinned with
  Pecq, Belgium
  Saint-Épiphane, Canada
  Swanmore, United Kingdom

See also
Communes of the Seine-Maritime department

References

Communes of Seine-Maritime